Peter Mortimer may refer to:

 Peter Mortimer (composer) (born 1750), English composer and organist for the Moravian Church
 Peter Mortimer (filmmaker) (born 1974), American filmmaker
 Peter Mortimer (footballer) (1875–1951), Scottish association football player
 Peter Mortimer (rugby league) (born 1956), Australian rugby league player
 Peter Mortimer (writer) (born 1943), Tyneside writer and editor